The 2007 Royal Trophy was the second edition of the Royal Trophy, a team golf event contested between teams representing Asia and Europe. It was held from 12–14 January at the Amata Spring Country Club in Thailand. Europe retained the trophy with an emphatic 12½–3½ victory, prompting suggestions that it might be desirable to even up the contest by having Europe play a combined team representing Asia and Australasia.

Teams

Schedule
12 January (Friday)  Foursomes x 4
13 January (Saturday)  Four-ball x 4
14 January (Sunday)  Singles x 8

Friday's matches (foursomes)

Saturday's matches (four-ball)

Sunday's matches (singles)

References

External links
Official site
Results and reports from Golf Today

Royal Trophy
Golf tournaments in Thailand
Royal Trophy
Royal Trophy
Royal Trophy